Slayback is a surname. Notable people with the surname include:
 Alonzo W. Slayback (1838-1882), a St. Louis, Missouri, lawyer and Confederate Army officer
 Charles E. Slayback (1840-1924), a grain merchant in Louisiana and Missouri

See also
 Slayback (comic book character)
 Slayback's Missouri Cavalry Regiment